Białków may refer to the following places in Poland:
Białków, Środa Śląska County in Lower Silesian Voivodeship (south-west Poland)
Białków, Wołów County in Lower Silesian Voivodeship (south-west Poland)
Białków, Słubice County in Lubusz Voivodeship (west Poland)
Białków, Żary County in Lubusz Voivodeship (west Poland)